The  is the premiere motorcycle road racing championship in Japan. It is run by the Motorcycle Federation of Japan (MFJ) (日本モーターサイクルスポーツ協会) – the Japanese affiliate of the FIM.

History
The MFJ was formed in 1961 and held its first motorcycle road race in 1967. 

The Championship's premiere class for a number of years had been the 500ccm class but it was replaced by a superbike class in 1994. During the 2002 season the championship was used by some manufacturers to test their MotoGP prototypes. The prototypes usually won the races but were not eligible for points. The series now runs a small seven round schedule but has a large field of Japanese riders and bikes. Similar to Spain's CEV championship, Moto3 motorcycles are used in Japan.

Champions

References

External links

MFJ Superbike News 
Moto Racing Japan List of Championship Winners

Motorsport competitions in Japan
Motorcycle road racing series
Superbike racing
National championships in Japan